George Petrus "Jorrie" Muller, born 1 March 1981 in Fochville (South Africa), is former a South African rugby union player, who played for South Africa 6 times in 2003, his last coming during the 2003 Rugby World Cup.

External links
ESPN Scrum profile

References

1981 births
Alumni of Monument High School
Living people
Afrikaner people
South African rugby union players
South Africa international rugby union players
Golden Lions players
Lions (United Rugby Championship) players
Commonwealth Games medallists in rugby sevens
Commonwealth Games bronze medallists for South Africa
Rugby sevens players at the 2002 Commonwealth Games
Rugby union players from Gauteng
Rugby union wings
Medallists at the 2002 Commonwealth Games